Maysville is an unincorporated community and census-designated place (CDP) in Benton County, Arkansas, United States. It is the westernmost settlement in the state of Arkansas. Per the 2020 census, the population was 117. It is located in the Northwest Arkansas region.

History
A post office has been in operation at Maysville since 1850. Maysville once rivaled Bentonville in size, according to local history.

Maysville is the location of (or is the nearest community to) Coats School, which is located on Spavinaw Creek Rd. and Sellers Farm, which is located on Old Hwy. on State Line. Both are listed on the National Register of Historic Places.

Demographics

2020 census

Note: the US Census treats Hispanic/Latino as an ethnic category. This table excludes Latinos from the racial categories and assigns them to a separate category. Hispanics/Latinos can be of any race.

Education
It is in the Gravette School District, which operates Gravette High School.

References

Census-designated places in Benton County, Arkansas
Census-designated places in Arkansas
1850 establishments in Arkansas